KCMO-FM (94.9 MHz, "94-9 KCMO") is a commercial radio station licensed to Shawnee, Kansas, and serving the Kansas City metropolitan area. The station is owned by Cumulus Broadcasting and airs a classic hits radio format, switching to all-Christmas music from mid-November to December 25.  KCMO-FM's studios and offices are located in the Corporate Woods area in Overland Park, Kansas.  The transmitter is off Menown Avenue in Independence, Missouri.

KCMO-FM broadcasts in the HD Radio format, with its HD2 signal airing an adult hits format, known as "102.5 Jack FM," which is simulcast on 250 watt translator K273BZ at 102.5 MHz.

History

Early years
One of the first FM stations in Kansas City, KCMO-FM signed on as KCFM in February 1948. It simulcasted 810 AM, at the time the frequency of KCMO (AM).  During the "Golden Age of Radio," the stations aired ABC Radio Network dramas, comedies, news, sports, game shows, soap operas and big band broadcasts.  The KCMO-FM call sign was granted in 1950, the first of several times the station would go by that call sign.

The Meredith Corporation bought KCMO-AM-FM in 1953.  On July 23, 1959, as the days of network programming ended, KCMO-AM-FM adopted a full service, middle of the road (MOR) personality format.

Beautiful music
On March 16, 1968, KCMO-FM separated its programming from 810 AM, and began airing a mostly instrumental beautiful music format as KCMU.  In 1974, the station began adding a few vocals to the format and switched its call letters to KCEZ, "EZ 95".

In 1983, The Meredith Corporation, which had owned KCMO-AM-FM since 1953, sold both stations to Richard Fairbanks, a one-time owner of what is now WXIA-TV in Atlanta, Georgia, and the head of Fairbanks Broadcasting.

Country and Top 40
On October 10, 1983, the station adopted a country music format as "KC 95."  The KCMO-FM call letters returned in 1984. The station gained attention when one of its billboards appeared in a Psychedelic Furs music video.  Fairbanks sold both stations in 1985 to the Summit Communications Group.  Summit changed KCMO-FM to a dance-leaning Top 40 format as KBKC, "B95", on July 26, 1985. The first song as "B95" was "Start Me Up" by The Rolling Stones.

The Gannett Company bought the station in 1986, and shifted the station to a more adult-friendly mainstream Top 40 format as "Power 95 KCPW," on August 25 of that year. During this period, Dick Wilson began as the morning host. Wilson would continue to host mornings on the frequency until 2017.

Switch to oldies
On July 28, 1989, at 5 p.m., after playing "Don't Wanna Lose You" by Gloria Estefan, KCPW flipped to an oldies format as "Oldies 95", with the third use of the KCMO-FM call sign acquired days before the switch. The first song on "Oldies 95" was "Kansas City" by Wilbert Harrison.

Another oldies station serving Kansas City, WHB (then at 710 AM), saw most of its listeners switch over to KCMO-FM in a matter of months, prompting that station's conversion to farm radio.

In 1993, Gannett sold KCMO-AM-FM to Bonneville International, which also owned KMBZ and KLTH (now KZPT). Four years later, Bonneville sold all four of its Kansas City stations together with three radio stations in Seattle to Entercom Communications.

Susquehanna Radio bought KCMO-AM-FM from Entercom in 2000, as Entercom was forced to sell the KCMO stations after its purchase of Sinclair Broadcast Group's radio stations KQRC, KXTR and KCIY, which left Entercom with two stations over the Federal Communications Commission's single-market ownership limit. Susquehanna subsequently merged with Cumulus Media in mid-2006.

Classic hits 
KCMO-FM enjoyed strong ratings throughout the 1990s and early 2000s. In 2005, management became concerned that the name "oldies" appealed to older listeners, less attractive to advertisers. Ratings weren't an issue, as the station was often in the Top 10. The station dropped its "oldies" moniker in April 2005 and shifted to its current classic hits format, playing only mid-'60s to early-'80s music.

In the mid-2010s, KCMO began playing hits from the early 1990s, and scaled back on music recorded before the 1970s. Today, the station's playlist focuses mainly on music from the 1980s.

KCMO-FM HD2
On February 14, 2011, the station turned on its HD2 sub-channel and launched an all-comedy format branded as "Funny 102.5."  It is also heard on translator station K273BZ (102.5 FM), hence the 102.5 in the moniker. On January 2, 2013, 102.5 FM flipped to sports talk, branded as "102.5 The Fan."

On August 15, 2014, at 3 p.m., the station abruptly dropped the sports format in the middle of a sports update, and began a 7-minute countdown. After the countdown, 102.5/94.9-HD2 became one of the first network affiliates of the new Cumulus-owned "Nash Icon" format as 102.5 Nash Icon, playing country hits from the 1980s, 90s and early 2000s. "Nash Icon" began with "Wagon Wheel" by Darius Rucker.

On November 2, 2015, at midnight, after playing "You Ain't Much Fun" by Toby Keith, 102.5/94.9-HD2 changed its format to alternative rock, branded as "102.5 The Underground", beginning with "Kansas City" by The New Basement Tapes. With the change, 102.5/94.9-HD2 became the first Nash/Nash Icon station to drop the format.

On June 15, 2016, at 7:30 a.m., after playing "Up & Up" by Coldplay, 102.5/94.9-HD2 swapped formats with co-owned KCJK, adopting that station's adult hits format, and rebranded as "102.5 Jack FM", while the alternative format moved to KCJK. The first song after the move was "Start Me Up" by The Rolling Stones.

References

External links
KCMO-FM official website

Dick Wilson and Company website
102.5 Jack FM/94.9 HD2 website

CMO-FM
Classic hits radio stations in the United States
Radio stations established in 1949
1949 establishments in Missouri
Cumulus Media radio stations